is a train station on the Koumi Line in the town of Sakuho, Minamisaku District, Nagano Prefecture, Japan, operated by East Japan Railway Company (JR East).

Lines
Haguroshita Station is served by the Koumi Line and is 57.8 kilometers from the starting point of the line at Kobuchizawa Station.

Station layout
The station consists of two ground-level side platforms connected by a level crossing. The station is staffed.

Platforms

History
Haguroshita Station opened on 25 December 1915. With the privatization of Japanese National Railways (JNR) on 1 April 1987, the station came under the control of JR East.

Passenger statistics
In fiscal 2015, the  station was used by an average of 118 passengers daily (boarding passengers only).

Surrounding area
Chikuma River
Haguroshita Post Office

See also
 List of railway stations in Japan

References

External links

 JR East station information 

Railway stations in Nagano Prefecture
Railway stations in Japan opened in 1915
Stations of East Japan Railway Company
Koumi Line
Sakuho, Nagano